The violet crow (Corvus violaceus) is a species of the crow family, Corvidae, native to Seram, an island in Indonesia. It was long considered a subspecies of the slender-billed crow but has been shown to be divergent genetically. Violet crows have a dark black head and slightly blue black body and have a slightly shorter bill than most other crow species.

References
http://www.hbw.com/species/violet-crow-corvus-violaceus

Corvus
Birds described in 1850
Taxa named by Charles Lucien Bonaparte